Catur means "four" in Sanskrit, and may refer to:

 Chaturanga, an ancient Indian strategy board game
 Turiya, pure consciousness in Hindu philosophy